Doug Ricks is an American businessman and politician serving as a Republican member of the Idaho Senate from the 34th district. Ricks previously served in the Idaho House of Representatives from 2018 to 2020.

Early life and education 
Ricks was born in Madison County, Idaho, and is the son of Evelyn and Mark Ricks. He grew up on a potato farm and attended Madison High School.

Ricks earned an associate degree in general agriculture and farm crop management and a Bachelor of Arts from Brigham Young University–Idaho.

Career 
As a businessman, in 1987, Ricks became the owner of a computer store in Rexburg, Idaho. In 2000, Ricks became a computer lab manager at Brigham Young University–Idaho.

Ricks is an Assistive Technology Coordinator at Brigham Young University–Idaho's Disability Services Office.

In 2016, Ricks ran for seat 34A in the Idaho House of Representatives, but lost the Republican primary to Ronald M. Nate.

In 2018, Ricks defeated Ronald M. Nate in the primary. On November 6, 2018, Ricks won the general election unopposed.

Ricks served on the following House committees:
 Judiciary, Rules & Administration
 Revenue & Taxation
 Transportation & Defense

In 2020, Ricks announced his candidacy for District 34 in the Idaho State Senate, after Idaho Senator Brent Hill decided not to seek reelection. Ricks defeated Jacob Householder in the Republican primary and was unopposed in the general election.

As of January 2021, Ricks serves on the following Senate committees:
 Judiciary & Rules – Vice Chair
 Agricultural Affairs
 Local Government & Taxation

Electoral history

2016

2018

2020

Personal life 
Ricks' wife is Melissa Ricks. They have five children. Ricks and his family live in Rexburg, Idaho.

References 

21st-century American politicians
Living people
Republican Party Idaho state senators
Republican Party members of the Idaho House of Representatives
People from Rexburg, Idaho
Year of birth missing (living people)